Toivanen is a Finnish surname.

Geographical distribution
As of 93.9% of all known bearers of the surname Toivanen were residents of Finland (frequency 1:805) and 2.9% of Sweden (1:46,447).

In Finland, the frequency of the surname was higher than national average (1:805) in the following regions:
 1. Northern Savonia (1:136)
 2. North Karelia (1:214)
 3. Kainuu (1:398)
 4. Southern Savonia (1:559)

People
Ahti Toivanen (born 1990), Finnish biathlete
Armi Toivanen (born 1980), Finnish actress
Erkki Toivanen (1938–2011), Finnish journalist 
Irma Toivanen (1922–2010), Finnish politician and teacher
Joonas Toivanen (born 1991), Finnish ice hockey player 
Laura Toivanen (born 1988), Finnish biathlete, sister or Ahti
Maarit Toivanen (born 1954), Finnish business executive

References

Finnish-language surnames